Nayla Tamraz is a Lebanese writer, art critic, curator, researcher and professor of Literature and Art History at Saint Joseph University of Beirut. She obtained her PhD in Comparative Literature (Literature and Art) from the New Sorbonne University (Paris III) in 2004.

Professional path 
Along with teaching Literature and Art History, Nayla Tamraz has also been, from 2008 to 2017, the Chair of the French Literature Department at Saint Joseph University of Beirut. In 2010, she designed, proposed and launched the MA and PhD program in Art Criticism and Curatorial Studies that she heads. Nayla Tamraz has also designed, organized, curated and co-curated several cultural events including the symposium "Littérature, Art et Monde Contemporain: Récits, Histoire, Mémoire" (2014, Beirut) and the exhibition "Poetics, Politics, Places" that took place in Tucumán, Argentina, from September to December 2017, in the frame of the International Biennale of Contemporary Art of South America (BienalSur).

Research field 
Nayla Tamraz' current research explores the issues related to the comparative theory and aesthetics of literature and art, which brings her to the topics of history, memory and narratives in literature and art in post-war Lebanon.  Since 2014, she's been developing a multi-disciplinary seminar and research platform on the paradigm of modernity. Her research leads her to question the relationship between poetics and politics as well as the representations associated with the notion of territory.

Publications

Books 
 Proust Portrait Peinture, Paris, Orizons, 2010
 Littérature, art et monde contemporain: récits, histoire, mémoire, Beirut, Presses de l'USJ, 2015

Co-edited issue 
Co-editor, with Claire Launchbury, special issue of the Contemporary French and Francophone studies entitled War, Memory, Amnesia: Postwar Lebanon, Routledge, volume 18, issue No. 5, 2014

Academic articles 
 "Le poème de Jad Hatem ou une poétique de la révélation" in Acanthe, French literature publications, Saint Joseph University, volume 19, 2001, pp. 73–79.
 "Le patriarche di Grado exorcisant un possédé dans Albertine disparue" in Acanthe, French literature publications, Saint Joseph University, volume 20, 2002, pp. 19–32
 "Transgression et littérature" in Acanthe, French literature publications, Saint Joseph University, volume 21-22, 2003–2004, pp. 337–363
 "Miss Sacripant d'Elstir: leçon d'art, leçon de vie" in Travaux et jours, Saint Joseph University, No. 75, 2005, pp. 171–210
 "Le corps foudroyé dans Figures de la foudre: Méditations poétiques sur trois sculptures de Réthy Tambourji de Jad Hatem" in Plaisance, Rivista quadrimestrale di letteratura francese moderna e contemporanea, Rome, No. 10, 4th year, 2007, pp. 117–130
 "L'image dans le texte: Albertine comme sujet pictural dans À la recherche du temps perdu de Marcel Proust" in Acanthe, French literature publications, Saint Joseph University, volume 24-25, 2006–2007, pp. 133–166
 "La géographie subjective dans quelques romans de Richard Millet" in Travaux et jours, Saint Joseph University, No. 81, 2008–2009, pp. 65–73
 "Pour une poétique de l'interpicturalité" in Acanthe, French literature publications, Saint Joseph University, volume 26-27, 2008–2009, pp. 109–121
 "Sympathie et système de valeurs: pour une réception de La Confession négative de Richard Millet" in Littératures, No. 63, 2011, Presses universitaires du Mirail, pp. 111–124
 "Le roman contemporain libanais et la guerre" in Contemporary French and Francophone Studies/ War, Memory, Amnesia: Postwar Lebanon, Routledge, volume 18, issue No. 5, 2014, pp. 462–469
 "Philippe de Champaigne et Blaise Pascal: dans l'enceinte de Port-Royal" in Acanthe, French literature publications, Saint Joseph University, volume 33, 2015, pp. 101–113
 "Pour une lecture de la ruine: Berytus de Rabee Jaber et Attempt 137 to Map the Drive de Jalal Toufic et Grazielle Rizkallah Toufic" in Littérature, art et monde contemporain: récits, histoire, mémoire, Beirut, Presses de l'USJ, pp. 201–221
 "Georges Schehadé: The Available Landscape" in The Place That Remains: Recounting the Un-built Territory, Lausanne, Skira, 2018, p. 166
 Mapping the City” in Saradar Collection Art Essays, online publication, May 2020, 15 pages.

Art criticism articles, texts on art, texts for catalogues and interviews 
 "Quand les mots deviennent image: pour une lecture des écrits poétiques de Georgé Chaanine" in Esquisse, Art magazine, No. 3, May 2001, p. 26
 "Alberto Giacometti, une ligne déchirant l'espace" in Esquisse, Art magazine, No. 3, May 2001, pp. 62–65
 Ayman Baalbaki's Mythological City, Beirut, Alarm Editions, 2009
 "Wael Shawky: la réécriture de l'histoire" in L'Art même, plastic arts chronicle of the French Community of Belgium, No. 51, 2nd quarter of 2011, p. 18
 "Mireille Kassar, AntiNarcissus" in Art Press, No. 431, March 2016, pp. 65–68
 "Experiencing the Mountain", Where I End and You Begin: Experiencing the Mountain, photographies by Nadim Asfar, May 2016
 "Money", Sifr, Hady Sy, January 2017
 "On Marginalisation, Activism and Feminism", dialogue with Etel Adnan, Lamia Joreige and Tagreed Darghouth, in Selections, No. 42, September 2017, pp. 48–61
 Poetics, Politics, Places, Catalogue, November 2017
 "Dreaming History" in Essays and Stories on Photography in Lebanon, Kaph publisher, 2018, pp. 297–299
 "Habiter les interstices", Habiter les interstices : Beyrouth, les artistes et la ville, January 2022
 “A journey in the art of Ayman Baalbaki” in The World in the Image of Man, Lebanese Pavilion of the 59th Venice Biennale, Skira, 2022
 “The Topos of Ruins in Ayman Baalbaki’s Work” in Ayman Baalbaki facing KO, Norma éditions, 2022, pp. 117-137
 “Farroukh to Sadek: from excess to presence”, walid sadek paintings 2020-2022, October 2022.

Creative writing 
 Passantes, Photographs by Alain Brenas, Beirut, Presses de l'Académie libanaise des Beaux-Arts, 2013

Curatorial practice 
 Le Secret, Espace Ygreg, Les bons voisins, Paris, France, April 4-April 28, 2017 (Co-curator)
 Poetics, Politics, Places, Timoteo Navarro Museum, Tucumán, Argentina, September–December 2017: In the frame of the International Biennale of Contemporary Art of South America (Curator)
 Habiter les interstices : Beyrouth, les artistes et la ville, Galerie Michel Journiac, Paris, France, January 2022 (co-curator)

References

External links
 USJ: Master Professionnel en critique d’art et curatoriat, Faculté des lettres et des sciences humaines
 Le Roman Contemporain Libanais et la Guerre : Récit, Histoire, Mémoire
 https://www.usj.edu.lb/pusj/catalogue/fiche.htm?id=O2727

Living people
Writers from Beirut
Year of birth missing (living people)